Cork Boat may refer to:
Cork Boat (vessel), a boat made almost entirely of wine corks
Cork Boat (book), a first-person account of the creation of the Cork Boat